How Will I Know if Heaven Will Find Me? is the third studio album by British alternative rock band the Amazons. The album was released on 9 September 2022 through Fiction Records and Universal Music Group.

Music and composition 
The album has been described by critics as having numerous genre influences, including elements of country rock and Americana, as well as jangle pop, indie pop, arena rock, and pop rock.

Critical reception 

How Will I Know if Heaven Will Find Me? has received generally positive reviews from contemporary music critics.

In a positive review, Karl Blakesley gave the album nine stars out of ten, summarising the album as "an utterly blissful" and "hugely uplifting record". Blakesley described How Will I Know if Heaven Will Find Me? as "a complete contrast to the darkness of previous album Future Dust, on HWIKIHWFM the band discover brighter and more profound sonic territory. The loud heavy riffs mostly take a back seat this time around, replaced instead with a greater focus on the songcraft and some noticeable country/Americana influences."

Siobhán Kane, writing for The Irish Times, gave How Will I Know if Heaven Will Find Me? a positive review, giving the album four stars out of five. Kane described the album as an "expansive" album with an ecletic mix of genres, specifically saying that the album had "a jangly guitar-led soundscape", as well as "broken beats and clear guitars (that) dance around Thomson's folk-influenced vocal". Kane summarised the album as "all indie-pop joy".

In a mixed review, Rhys Buchanan with NME dismissed the album as an album loaded with "stadium-ready anthems" and that "the Reading band aren't about to mess with the formula with album three". Buchanan awarded How Will I Know if Heaven Will Find Me? three stars out of five. John Earls, writing for Record Collector, also offered a mixed review of the album. Earls said "mostly the band are happy to offer sturdy would-be epics in the vein of their early near-hit 'Junk Food Forever'. If they sometimes strain too hard to pull off The Joshua Tree universality."

Track listing

Personnel 
 Greg Calbi – mastering
 Jim Abbiss – producer

Charts

References

External links 
 

2022 albums
Fiction Records albums
The Amazons (band) albums
Albums produced by Jim Abbiss